Nicholas Lofton Hexum (born April 12, 1970) is an American singer, songwriter and rapper, currently the lead vocalist and rhythm guitarist for the multi-platinum alternative rock band 311 and The Nick Hexum Quintet.

Early life
Born in Madison, Wisconsin, to father Dr. Terry Hexum and mother Pat, Hexum went to Westside High School in Omaha, Nebraska. There, he played in the school's concert jazz band, and was a member of several local bands like The Extras, The Eds, and The Right Profile. In 1988, Hexum moved to Los Angeles to pursue music with his band Unity, including Chad Sexton, Ward Bones, and Marcus Watkins. However, this group soon parted ways. Hexum moved to Germany for a brief stint in 1990; while there, he got a call from Sexton, who was back in Omaha. Sexton's band Fish Hippos had a gig with Fugazi and he invited Hexum to join the band. Hexum agreed, but said they needed to change the band's name. At that show, they announced from stage that their name was 311.

311

311 began playing together in 1990. Hexum was considered the band's manager and also did the legwork of organizing their schedule. He took out a student loan and used the money to get time at Rainbow Studios in Omaha to record their first independent album, Dammit!, released under his own record company, "What Have You Records". The band released three albums, Dammit!, Unity, and Hydroponic. In 1992, the band felt they'd done all they could on the local scene and moved out to Los Angeles to pursue a record deal. They signed to Capricorn Records.

Since then, 311 has released 13 major label records. They have performed over 2,000 shows in 27 countries and all 50 U.S. states. Hits include "Amber", "Down", "You Wouldn't Believe", "Creatures (For a While)", and many more.

Personal life
Hexum has three siblings: Angela, Zack, and half-brother Patrick. His parents are divorced. Patrick died fighting an opioid addiction.

Hexum was in a relationship with Nicole Scherzinger of The Pussycat Dolls from 2000 to 2004.

Hexum married his wife Nikki on New Year's Eve 2008; they have three daughters. Their oldest daughter, Echo, was born in a home birth on August 29, 2009. Their second daughter, Maxine, was born May 1, 2011, which was also Nikki's birthday. Due to the absence of the family's midwife, Hexum performed the delivery. Their third daughter, Harlow, was born September 16, 2014. Harlow starred in the TV series Agents of S.H.I.E.L.D. as Alya Fitz.

Hexum has contributed to the charity collaboration Band of Merrymakers.

Discography

with 311
Dammit! (1990)
Unity (1991)
Hydroponic EP (1992)
Music (1993)
Grassroots (1994)
311 (1995)
Transistor (1997)
Soundsystem (1999)
From Chaos (2001)
Evolver (2003)
Don't Tread on Me (2005)
Uplifter (2009)
Universal Pulse (2011)
Stereolithic (2014)
Mosaic (2017)
Voyager (2019)

with The Nick Hexum Quintet
My Shadow Pages (2013)

with George Clanton
"Crash Pad" b/w "King for a Day" (2019)
"Under Your Window" b/w "Out of the Blue" (2019)
George Clanton & Nick Hexum (2020)

Guest appearances 
 The Urge - Master of Styles (1998, vocals on "Jump Right In")
 Sugar Ray - Sugar Ray (2001, vocals on "Stay On")
 Goldfinger - The Knife (2017, vocals on "Liftoff")
 Dirty Heads - Swim Team (2017, vocals on "So Glad You Made It")
 Neverending White Lights - Act 1: Goodbye Friends of the Heavenly Bodies (2006, vocals on "Age of Consent")
 Disco Fries - Autonomous (2015, vocals on "Head in the Clouds")

References

1970 births
Alternative rock singers
Midwest hip hop musicians
American people of Norwegian descent
American rock guitarists
American male guitarists
American rock singers
Living people
Musicians from Omaha, Nebraska
Musicians from Madison, Wisconsin
Nu metal singers
Rappers from Nebraska
Rappers from Wisconsin
Reggae rock musicians
Lead guitarists
Rhythm guitarists
20th-century American singers
21st-century American singers
20th-century American guitarists
21st-century American guitarists
21st-century American rappers
20th-century American male singers
21st-century American male singers
311 (band) members